Stupid Girl may refer to:

"Stupid Girl" (Rolling Stones song), a 1966 song by The Rolling Stones from the album Aftermath
"Stupid Girl", a 1975 song by Neil Young & Crazy Horse from the album Zuma
"Stupid Girl" (Garbage song), a 1996 single by Garbage from their self-titled album
"Stupid Girl" (Cold song), a 2003 single by Cold, from the album Year of the Spider
"Stupid Girls",  a 2006 single by Pink from the album I'm Not Dead
"Stupid Girl (Only In Hollywood)", a 2010 single by Saving Abel from the album Miss America
"You Stupid Girl", a 2010 single by Framing Hanley from the album A Promise to Burn